The New Zealand EW class locomotive was a type of electric locomotive used in Wellington, New Zealand. The classification "EW" was due to their being electric locomotives allocated to Wellington. For two decades until the advent of the DX class they were the most powerful locomotives in New Zealand.

Introduction 

The EW class were ordered by New Zealand Railways from English Electric through their New Zealand agents Cory-Wright & Salmon in 1951 as a replacement for the earlier ED class electric locomotives on passenger duties. It was felt that the ED class was not suitable for this, and so English Electric was commissioned to build a twin-section articulated electric locomotive for use on the Wellington 1.5 kV DC electrified system.

The new EW class was the first locomotive class in New Zealand to utilise the Bo-Bo-Bo wheel arrangement, which would subsequently be used on the Mitsubishi DJ class and Brush EF class locomotives. However, the EW class was different in that the central Jacobs bogie was placed under the articulation of the two body halves with limited side play, whereas the DJ and EF classes have a single fixed body with side play in the central bogie.

It was intended that the EW class would work on all trains in the Wellington area, as well as banking trains between Paekakariki and Pukerua Bay.

Service
The EW class predominantly worked on passenger trains, particularly on suburban trains to the Hutt Valley and Paekakariki. They also ran in regular service hauling Main Trunk expresses between Wellington and Paekakariki, where they would be exchanged for a steam locomotive for the run north. They also were used to bank trains between Wellington and Paekakariki, although this work was more usually done by the older ED class which were unsuited for passenger workings.

Less frequently, the EW class also operated suburban shunting services, particularly on the Johnsonville Branch, where their flexible bodies and higher power output of  gave them a distinct advantage over the older ED class. Much of this traffic was stock destined for the Raroa stockyard sidings, from where they would be driven to the Ngauranga Freezing Works nearby, while the remainder was general freight destined largely for Johnsonville.

The class was well-liked by the railway unions as NZR had worked closely with them in the design phase of the EW class. This led to the cabs being laid out in an ergonomic fashion which made them easy to operate, making them a favourite of the unions.

Renumbering 
With the introduction of the Traffic Monitoring System (TMS) in 1979, the locomotives were renumbered EW96-EW165.

Withdrawal 

The tunnel floors between Paekakariki and Wellington were lowered so that DA class diesel locomotives could haul trains through to Wellington without having to stop at Paekakariki to be replaced by an ED or EW; the work was completed in 1967. The EWs continued to have a role in this, primarily as a banking locomotive.

In 1980, EW159 (EW 1805) was briefly sent to Otira following the Goat Creek washout, which had damaged three of the EO class locomotives. During its time there the locomotive required its own driver as it lacked multiple-unit equipment. When the three rebuilt EOs returned, EW 159 was transferred back to Wellington. The following year, the decision was made by the CME to have EW136 (EW 1802), then under overhaul, withdrawn and scrapped. This was agreed to as the use of the EW class had decreased, and 136 became the first EW to be withdrawn.

The arrival of the EM class units in 1982 locomotive-hauled carriage trains were eliminated, with all carriage-hauled services ceasing in 1983 with the exception of the Masterton and Palmerston North services, which had been diesel-hauled since their inception. The last EW to haul a suburban train was EW142 (EW 1803) from Paekakariki to Wellington on 11 February 1983. EW142 ran an excursion known as "The Suburban Rail Ranger" to Johnsonville on 14 May 1983.

The EW class finished its working life on mainline goods trains, banking DA or DX class locomotives between Wellington and Paekakariki with Train 778, the Wellington-Palmerston North petrol tank train, being a common assignment. This was the last service to use the EW class, concluding on 20 December 1983 when EW142 banked DX5477 on the last revenue operation of the EW class. All of the remaining locomotives were put into storage.

Storage
As the EW class was not worn out, NZR management decided to have the six remaining locomotives placed into interim storage until a new use could be found for them. It was decided to store the locomotives in available locomotive sheds around the country which would provide secure, and where possible covered, storage.

The locomotives were dispersed as follows:
 EW107 and EW 159 were moved to Stratford.
 EW113 was moved to Addington Workshops.
 EW142 and EW 165 were moved to the Hutt Workshops.
 EW171 was moved to Timaru, before moving to Palmerston and then Hillside Workshops.

In 1988, the decision was made to move EW171 north to Christchurch, and it was donated to the Electric Traction Group at Ferrymead, arriving in time to take part in the Ferrymead 125 motive power cavalcade.

As New Zealand Railways was creating its Heritage Fleet at this time, it was decided to select an EW for preservation. EW165 was chosen and was moved to Wellington for remedial work along with DE1389 (DE 508) prior to its official inclusion in the fleet. The remaining locomotives were scrapped; EW107 and EW159 were towed back to Hutt Workshops in 1988 where they joined EW 142 prior to being scrapped. EW113 went to Linwood for a period before it was later towed to a siding at Woolston alongside the South Island Main Trunk where it remained for a short time before being scrapped in early 1990.

Preservation
The first EW class locomotive to be preserved, EW 1806 (TMS EW171), was donated to the Canterbury Railway Society in 1988. It is based at Ferrymead Heritage Park and is in storage. It has been renumbered as EW 1806, and carries this identity on its headstocks only.

The other, EW 165 (EW 1805), was based in Wellington, originally in the old NZR Parcels depot on Platform 9 of Wellington Station, before moving to the Carriage and Wagon workshop near the Thorndon overpass. It retained its TMS identity of EW 165 throughout until the decision was made to disperse the Heritage Fleet in 2004. The EW was not sold until August 2005 when it was purchased by Ian Welch of the Mainline Steam Heritage Trust. The locomotive made one final run under then-Toll Rail ownership on 21 August 2005 when it was driven by veteran locomotive driver Fred Hamer from Wellington to Paekakariki. It was then towed by DCP 4611 to Mainline's Plimmerton depot.

Since arrival, EW 165 has been restored as EW 1805 complete with replica number plates. It is intended that the locomotive will be used to operate suburban railfan trips around Wellington when the overhaul is finished, although this is pending certification and the construction of a suitable length of overhead into the depot to allow 1805 to move around. The locomotive was revealed as EW 1805 over Labour Weekend 2008 when it was towed to Feilding to take part in the NIMT centenary celebrations.

Accidents
The EW class have been involved in three major accidents during their service lives:
 1963 - EW 1806 runs into a slip on the line near Pukerua Bay and derails.
 1964 - EW 1803 hauling an empty suburban service collides with Bagnall DSA 248 hauling a shunt at Taita railway station. The driver on the EW passed a signal at danger and was subsequently fired. Need to check if this was between Waterloo and Woburn!
 1975 - EW 1805 overruns the buffers at Wellington railway station. It was discovered the cocks on the air-brake hoses on the second carriage had been closed during shunting, limiting the operation of the air-brakes to the locomotive and first carriage only. The NO 2 end of the EW was subsequently rebuilt with a new style of window different from the standard EW type windows, and retains this modification today in preservation.
 1979 - EW 1805 sustained damage in a shunting collision at Taita on 2 July 1979.

References

Footnotes

Citations

Bibliography

External links
 New Zealand Railways Rolling Stock Lists - Class EW

Bo-Bo-Bo locomotives
English Electric locomotives
1500 V DC locomotives
Electric locomotives of New Zealand
Railway locomotives introduced in 1952
3 ft 6 in gauge locomotives of New Zealand
Robert Stephenson and Hawthorns locomotives